Carlos Alberto Taylhardat (Maracay, June 6, 1921, – Caracas, November 21, 2011), was a Venezuelan naval captain and diplomat. He was the son of Carlos Albert Taylhardat a Venezuelan lawyer. He trained in military school in Italy, until 1942. He was a naval captain in Venezuela for 30 years, and the ambassador of Venezuela to Beirut, Lebanon and Baghdad, Iraq in 1990 to 1994.

Cuban revolution
Taylhardat  helped Fidel Castro in 1958 by buying World War II weapons from the United States, to later deliver, via the Venezuelan government, to Castro's revolution in the Sierra Maestra.

References in print
BARRETO, Braulio. Bajo el terror de la SN (1984)

COLECTIVO. La violencia en la Venezuela reciente, 1958–1980. Volumen 3 (1992)

COLECTIVO. El 23 de enero y las Fuerzas Armadas Venezolanas (Ministeio de Defensa (Venezuela, 1990)

COLECTIVO. Gobierno y época de la junta revolucionaria (Congreso de la República. (Caracas, 1990)

GARCÍA PONCE, Guillermo. La fuga del cuartel San Carlos (1991)

MALDONADO, Jorge. Génesis y consecuencias del 23 de enero de 1958 (1984)

PÉREZ LECUNA, Roberto. Apuntes para la historia militar de Venezuela (1999)

RAMÍREZ, Edito. Memorias de un inconforme

RIVAS RIVAS, José. Historia gráfica de Venezuela: El gobierno de Rómulo Betancourt (1972)

SUAREZ PEREZ, Eugenio (y otros). Fidel: de Cinco Palmas a Santiago (2006)

YANES, Oscar. Hoy es mañana, o, Las vainas de un reportero muerto (1994)

TAYLHARDAT, Carlos Alberto. La Infantería de Marina en combate (Revista Militar, v.51; Buenos Aires, 1951)

External links
 La vanguardia (10-VI-1961)
 Fotografía de Carlos Alberto Taylhardat, por Ringo
 Acontecimientos de Diciembre de 1958
 La ruta del poder, de Rafael Rojas
 Una historia militar de las Fuerzas Armadas, lectura en linea

Venezuelan diplomats
1921 births
2011 deaths
Ambassadors of Venezuela to Iraq
Ambassadors of Venezuela to Lebanon
Venezuelan expatriates in Italy